Ainehvand or Aineh Vand may refer to:
 Ainehvand-e Abdollah
 Ainehvand-e Darreh Rashteh
 Ayenehvand
 Aineh Vand, Sarpol-e Zahab